Law enforcement in Poland consists of the Police (Policja), City Guards (named in urban areas “Straż Miejska” or in rural areas “Straż Gminna”, which is a type of municipal police), and several smaller specialised agencies. The Prokuratura Krajowa (the Polish public prosecutor) and an independent judiciary also play an important role in the maintenance of law and order.

History

Pre 20th century

During the period of the Polish–Lithuanian Commonwealth's existence, most law enforcement was undertaken by a group of  nobles of varying degrees of importance who possessed private armies and who, in return for political power and a place within the nation's social hierarchy, swore their allegiance, and that of their mercenary troops, to the king. As a result of the enduring power of a number of powerful 'magnates' within the social hierarchy, relative weakness of the 'elected' monarchs and continued existence of the feudal system in Polish society, centralised rule of law and enforcement of the same did not truly exist until the 1791 adoption of the 3 May Constitution.

The Constitution aimed to weaken the golden freedoms of the upper classes and redistribute a portion of their power amongst the mercantile middle classes. In addition to this, the establishment of a majority-voting Sejm and increased centralisation of sovereign power under the authority of the king, led to the establishment of a standing army, provided for by the state and subordinate only to the king and authorities of the national government.

As a result of the 1772–95 partitions of Poland, and subsequent rule of the partitioning powers (Austria-Hungary, Germany and Russia), the authority of King Stanisław August collapsed, and the former territories of the commonwealth came under the direct supervision of their partitioning powers' law enforcement services.

In Austrian-controlled Galicia, the Imperial Gendarmerie became responsible for preserving public order and later became known for being arguably the least oppressive of the three occupying powers. In both the Russian and German territories of the former Poland, it was widely reported that law enforcement agencies and paramilitaries engaged in both oppression of Polish political organisations and the forced assimilation of local culture with those of their own nations.

Post 1919 Independence until today

In 1919, with the re-independence of the Polish nation, the state reorganised itself along non-federalist lines and established a centralised form of government. Under the auspices of the new government, a new national police force was formed; this 'Polish State Police' (Policja Państwowa) then existed as the primary law enforcement agency for the entire nation up until the outbreak of the Second World War in 1939. During the inter-war period, a number of key law enforcement duties were delegated to other formations, such as the Border Guard and Military Gendarmerie.

With the end of World War II and the onset of the communist period, the new Soviet backed government decided to radically change to structure of policing in Poland; the state 'Policja' was renamed as the 'Milicja Obywatelska' (Citizen's Militia), a name which was meant to reflect a change in the role of the police, from an instrument of oppression ensuring the position of the bourgeoisie, to a force composed of, and at the service of 'normal citizens'.

The reality turned out to be largely the opposite, and the Milicja instead represented a rather state-controlled force which was used to exert political repression on the citizens. The Milicja was, for the most part, detested by the general populace; events such as the police's conduct during the Gdańsk Shipyard Strike and surrounding the Popiełuszko affair, only worsened the people's view of their law enforcement agencies.

After the fall of the communist government in Poland, the system was reformed once again, this time reviving the pre-war name of 'Policja' and albeit with a few minor changes, the general system of law-enforcement of the Second Republic.

Police

The Policja (Police) is the national police force of Poland. It is directly responsible to the national government. Officers are routinely armed, and are responsible for the investigation of most ordinary crimes. They are responsible for many specialist services such as highway patrol and counter-terrorism. They can be contacted by calling "997" from any telephone.

As Poland is a very centralised state, regional law enforcement agencies do not exist in the way that they do in the United States, Canada,  Germany or the United Kingdom. While voivodeship (regional) commands exist within the organisational structure of the Policja, the regional authorities do not have any major say in law enforcement policy.

City Guard

Several gmina in Poland have their own police forces, which work in conjunction with the Policja. They have more limited powers than the Policja, and do not currently carry firearms. They can be contacted by calling "986" from any telephone.

Other law enforcement and security agencies

In addition to the Policja and the City Guards, there are also a number of specialised agencies which operate with more specific objectives.

 Centralne Biuro Śledcze Policji: Police agency dealing with countering organised crime.
 Agencja Bezpieczeństwa Wewnętrznego: Responsible for matters related to Poland's internal security, including counter-espionage and counter-terrorism. It is analogous to the American Federal Bureau of Investigation (FBI), and British Security Service (MI5). It is responsible directly to the Prime Minister.
 Służba ochrony państwa: A protective security unit tasked with the protection of the Polish President, Prime Minister, Ministers of State, and other 'at-risk' persons within the government.
 Centralne Biuro Antykorupcyjne: Responsible for investigating and preventing corruption in both the public and private sectors. It was founded in 2006, and is responsible directly to the Prime Minister.
 Służba Celno-Skarbowa: The Polish Customs Service is responsible for collecting customs duties, mostly at Poland's borders, and is responsible to the Ministry of Finance.
 Oddział Wart Cywilnych: Armed civilian watchmen tasked with protecting military areas. They are responsible to the Ministry of Defence.
 Służba Więzienna
 Straż Graniczna: Responsible for border protection at land borders and other points of entry, such as airports.
 Straż Ochrony Kolei: Typically armed security unit operating on trains and at railway stations.
 Żandarmeria Wojskowa: The military police of the Polish armed forces. They have authority over all service personnel, as well as civilians working for the armed forces or living on military bases and foreign soldiers based in Poland. As part of the armed forces, they are responsible to the Ministry of Defence
 Straż Marszałkowska: Police of the Parliament of Poland, responsible for the security of the deputies and senators as well as of the buildings of the legislative branch.

Transportation and equipment

The Policja are routinely armed, and use a variety of marked and unmarked cars, vans, motorbikes and other vehicles. Their most common patrol car is currently the Kia Cee'd.

Other law enforcement agencies operate more standardised fleets which usually contain only one or two vehicle models. This is usually because City Guards source all the cars of their small fleets from one firm so as to reduce cost, whilst more specialised services buy large fleets of vehicles specific to their requirements, an example of which would be the large use of all-terrain Land Rover Defenders by the Border Guard.

See also
 Crime in Poland
 Human rights in Poland
 Law in Poland
 Milicja Obywatelska
 Ministry of Interior and Administration of the Republic of Poland
 Ministry of Justice of the Republic of Poland
 Police corruption in Poland
 Police ranks of Poland
 Prisons in Poland

References

External links
 2021 Country Reports on Human Rights Practices: Poland

 
National law enforcement agencies of Poland
Specialist law enforcement agencies of Poland